Tatjana Mirković (Jelača / Јелача, born 10 August 1990) is a Serbian javelin thrower.

Career 
Jelača won the gold medal at the 2007 European Youth Olympic Festival, bronze medal at the 2008 World Junior Championships and gold medal at the 2009 European Junior Championships. She received the award for the best Serbian young athlete in 2009.

She also competed at the 2008 and 2012 Olympic Games without reaching the final round.

At the 2011 World Championships she failed to qualify for the final, finishing at the 24th place in the qualifications.

At the 2010 European Championships she won a 12th place and at the 2012 European Championships she won a 7th place.

Jelača made breakthrough in her senior career in qualifications of the 2013 World Championship when she threw national record 62.68 meters. She came 9th in final.

She won her first senior medal, silver at the 2014 European Championship with a huge personal best which is also national record 64.21 meters.

Her coaches are Goran Pavlović, Aleksandar Spajić and Dragiša Đorđić.

Personal life 
In  March 2015,  Tatjana  Jelača  and  her  fiancé  Bojan Mirković   were  married; their   son   Nikola was  born in September 2015 in Frankfurt,  Germany.

Personal bests

Achievements

See also
 Serbian records in athletics

References

External links
 
 
 
 
 

1990 births
Living people
Sportspeople from Sremska Mitrovica
Serbian female javelin throwers
Olympic athletes of Serbia
Athletes (track and field) at the 2008 Summer Olympics
Athletes (track and field) at the 2012 Summer Olympics
European Athletics Championships medalists
Mediterranean Games silver medalists for Serbia
Athletes (track and field) at the 2013 Mediterranean Games
Mediterranean Games medalists in athletics
21st-century Serbian women